Westlands Constituency is an electoral constituency in Kenya. It is one of the seventeen constituencies in Nairobi County. The constituency is situated within Westlands Sub-county, formerly Westlands District. The entire constituency is located within Nairobi City County. It was known as Nairobi Northwest Constituency at the 1963 elections, then as Parklands Constituency and since 1988 elections it has been known as Westlands Constituency.

In 2013, the Independent Electoral and Boundaries Commission hived off a portion of Westlands Constituency to form part of Dagoretti North Constituency.

Westlands constituency contains some of the high suburb areas such as Runda, LakeView, Muthaiga, Kitisuru and Highridge, as well as slum areas like Kangemi, Githogoro, DeepSea, Mji Wa Huruma, Kaptagat, Kibagare, Ndumboini, Maasai and Suswa.

Members of Parliament

Locations and wards

Westlands Sub-county
The Sub-county shares the same boundaries with what was Westlands Division of Nairobi and constituency prior to 2013. Some areas that are electorally placed under Dagoretti North Constituency such as: Kilimani, Lavington, Muthangari, Maziwa and Kileleshwa, form part of the sub-county.  The Sub-county is headed by the sub-county administrator, appointed by a County Public Service Board.

References

External links 
Map of the constituency
Social Audit of the constituency

Constituencies in Nairobi
1963 establishments in Kenya
Constituencies established in 1963